Eighth All-Ukrainian Congress of Soviets was a congress of  Soviets (councils) of workers, peasants, Red-army-men deputies that took place in Kharkiv on January 17 - 20, 1924.

Composition
No data

Agenda
 Report of government of the Soviet Ukraine
 Report about the Constitution of the Soviet Union (People's Commissar of Justice and General Prosecutor Mykola Skrypnyk)
 About budged of the UkrSSR
 About situation of industry in Ukraine
 About land use
 About Red Army
 Elections to the All-Ukrainian Central Executive Committee

Decisions
 (Report of government) the Congress unanimously approved the government and its activities and outlined ways of further development of national economy, culture, and education as well as increasing of the well being of working people. The Congress instructed the government of the UkrSSR to review issue of construction of hydroelectric station on Dnieper (later known as DniproHES).
 (Report about Constitution) the Congress ratified the treaty approved by the First All-Union Congress of Soviets about creation of the Soviet Union and the Constitution accepted by the second session of the All-Union Central Executive Committee and instructed the All-Ukrainian Central Executive Committee review the Constitution of the UkrSSR in accordance with the treaty about creation of the Soviet Union and submit it for approval at the Ninth All-Ukrainian Congress of Soviets.
 strengthening of state budget
 further development of industry and agriculture
 streamlining land use regulations
 underlined necessity in further strengthening of the Red Army and Fleet
 other

References

External links
Brazhnikov, V. Eighth All-Ukrainian Congress of Soviets. Ukrainian Soviet Encyclopedia

8
Political history of Ukraine
1924 in Ukraine
History of Kharkiv
1924 in politics
Communism in Ukraine
1924 conferences